Chaim Zlotikman (חיים זלוטיקמן; also "Haim"; born March 17, 1957) is an Israeli former professional basketball player. He played the shooting guard position. He scored 5,812  career points, 10th-most in Israel Basketball Premier League history, and also played for the Israeli national basketball team.

Biography
Zlotikman was born in Tel Aviv, Israel. He was 1.93 meters tall.

He played for Hapoel Givatayim, Hapoel Tel Aviv, Maccabi Rishon LeZion, Hapoel Holon, and Hapoel Haifa for 19 seasons, from 1975 to 1995, in the Israel Basketball Premier League. He scored 5,812  career points, 10th-most in Israel Basketball Premier League history.

Zlotikman played for the Israeli national basketball team. He played in the 1976 FIBA European Championship for Junior Men, 1981 FIBA European Championship for Men, 1983 FIBA European Championship for Men, 1984 FIBA European Olympic Qualifying Tournament for Men, and 1985 FIBA European Championship for Men.

See also
Israeli Basketball Premier League Statistical Leaders
Sports in Israel

References 

1957 births
Sportspeople from Tel Aviv
Israeli men's basketball players
Hapoel Ramat Gan Givatayim B.C. players
Hapoel Tel Aviv B.C. players
Hapoel Holon players
Hapoel Haifa B.C. players
Israeli Basketball Premier League players

Living people